Chen Lin (born  March 7, 1977) is a former female Chinese badminton player. She won the bronze medal at the 2001 Badminton World Championships in the women's doubles together with Jiang Xuelian.

Achievements

External links 
 Profile at badmintoncn.com
 
 
 
 

Badminton players from Hunan
1977 births
Living people
People from Zhuzhou
Chinese female badminton players
Olympic badminton players of China
Badminton players at the 2000 Summer Olympics